Skiemonys is a town in Anykščiai district municipality, in Utena County, in northeast Lithuania. According to the 2011 census, the town has a population of 38 people.

Gallery

References

Towns in Utena County
Towns in Lithuania
Trakai Voivodeship
Vilkomirsky Uyezd
Anykščiai District Municipality